Basara may refer to:

Places 
 Basara, Pirot, Serbia
 Basar, Telangana, a census town in Nirmal district in the state of Telangana, India (also known as Basara)
 Basra, a city in Iraq (also known as Basara)

Entertainment 
 Basara (manga), a 1990–98 manga series by Yumi Tamura
 Basara Nekki, a character in the anime series Macross 7
 Kubikiri Basara, a character in Samurai Shodown
 Sengoku Basara, Japanese name of the video game Devil Kings
 Devil Kings Basara, a manga series based on the video game
 Basara (wrestler), Japanese professional wrestler
 Pro-Wrestling Basara, a Japanese professional wrestling promotion founded in 2015

Surname
Basara is a Serbian surname. It may refer to:
 Svetislav Basara (born 1953), Serbian writer
 Marko Basara (born 1984), Serbian footballer

See also 
 Basra (disambiguation)
 Basar (disambiguation)